Elachista anserinelloides is a moth of the family Elachistidae that is endemic to France.

References

anserinelloides
Moths described in 2003
Moths of Europe